Perf or PERF may refer to:
 Perf (Lahn), a river in Germany
 perf (Linux), a performance analyzing tool in Linux
 Perf de Castro (Perfecto de Castro), Filipino musician
 Perfect (grammar), a glossing abbreviation used in linguistics
 Police Executive Research Forum, a US national membership organization
 A perforation 
 Film perforations
"Perf", a single recorded by singer and social media personality Baby Ariel

See also
 Perfect (disambiguation)
 Performance (disambiguation)